Wundanyi is a town in the Taita-Taveta County of Kenya. Other urban centres in the county include Voi, Taveta and Mwatate.

Location
The coordinates of Wundanyi are 03°23'54.0"S.  38°21'37.9"E (Latitude: −3.398329; Longitude: 38.360526).

Overview
The town is a popular base for hiking, while local attractions include the Ngangao Forest, known for its butterflies, Wesu Rock and the Cave of Skulls.  Shomoto Hill, across the valley from Wundanyi was the formal place of execution for the Taita. Wundanyi is the centre of an agricultural area and the surrounding slopes are highly terraced.

Population
In 2011, the population of Taita-Taveta County was quoted at 284,657. As of May 2015, the population of Wundayi town was estimated at 21.9 percent of the county population, about 62,340 people.

See also
 Bura, Taita-Taveta County
 Wesu District Hospital

References

External links
 Website of Taita-Taveta County Government

Populated places in Taita-Taveta County
Populated places in Kenya
Geography of Kenya